Sunny Radio is a set of radio stations based in Sioux Falls, South Dakota with the call Letters KZOY and KZOI. KZOY broadcasts a 1980s format and was the first ever radio station besides satellite to do so. It is currently the third most popular radio station in the Sioux Falls metropolitan area.

History and present state
Sunny Radio was formed by a local couple, John and Heidi Small. John had previous radio experience and always dreamed of owning his own station. In the summer of 2009, the couple built the Sioux Empire's only locally owned radio station, as the others are all owned by companies. They decided on a 1980s format since the music is fun to dance to, which goes with their 'sunny' theme, and also to cater to the older audience who were previously left with no choice but to listen to modern music because there was little variety. They went with the slogan "Sunny Radio, where it's ALWAYS in the 80's!" 

Although it is mainly a Sioux Empire station, a great deal of talk revolves around Brandon, the community the Smalls live in.
In 2010, they purchased an old AM station from Backyard Broadcasting, since they did not use AM 1520. KZOY AM 1520 launched on May 15, 2010, FM 92.1 launched September 1, 2010.  Sunny is no longer broadcasting at 92.1 MHz - KZOY is repeated on K227CZ FM 93.3.

The station added a second channel in Dakota City, Nebraska, KZOI AM 1250, which is repeated on K246CJ FM 97.1 in Sioux City, Iowa as of February, 2016. This addition was borne of a desire to expand the reach of their market, as well as to improve the quality and scope of their broadcasting infrastructure.

The station also broadcasts online at its website.

The small radio station is growing rapidly with many national programs from the 1980s on the weekends like Casey Kasem's 80's show, The Amazing 80's with MG Kelly and Rick Dees Weekly Top 40. During the week, the radio shows are all local, these include: The John and Heidi Show, Maddy in the Midday, The B Side with Joshua Wayne, Jammin' Jay Williams and "The Night Ride" with KITT runs overnight.

Broadcast Locations
KZOY and K227CZ:  Sioux Falls, South Dakota  
KZOI:  Dakota City, Nebraska 
K246CJ:  Sioux City, Iowa

References

External links